Thazhekode  is a village in Perinthalmanna in the state of Kerala, India.

Demographics
 India census, Thazhekode had a population of 21764 with 10348 males and 11416 females.

History
Thazekode was once the control of Nedungadies, the Nedunganad Rajas under Chera Kings. Later on captured by Valluvanad Rajas and Zamorin Rajas respectively. This place is situated at the foothill of Amminikadan Mala (mountain). The National High Way No. 213 is passing through it.

Thazhekode
Thazhekode. The place was famous for rice, hill produce, and forest products. Muslim families like Cholamugath , Ponneth , Nellaya and Nalakath are known for their wisdom and rich contributions for development of the place. Thazhekkode is the birth Place of former Education Minister Sri . Nalakath Sooppy and Adv. Cholamugath Koya, who was elected to Kerala Assembly in 1965 (which was dispersed by the President of India, since there was no majority for a party/alliance).

Valaamkurishi
The western portion of Thazhekode is known as Valaamkurisi, connected to the name of Valluvanad Rajas. Most of the landed property was in the holding of Pallasseri Moothamans, a title adorned by a branch of Nedungadies. After defeat of Valluvand, Zamoorin raja gave the control of this place to his chief Kotharayans, the second sthani of Kuthiravattathu Thampans.

Transportation
Thazhekkod village connects to other parts of India through Perinthalmanna and Mannarkkad towns.  National highway No.966 passes through Tirur and the northern stretch connects to Goa and Mumbai.  The southern stretch connects to Cochin and Trivandrum.   Highway No.966 goes to Palakkad and Coimbatore.   The nearest airport is at Kozhikode.  The nearest major railway station is at [Shoranur]. Angadippuram railway station is 12 km away from Thazhekode.

References

   Villages in Malappuram district
Perinthalmanna area